Aquilegia chrysantha, the golden columbine, is a perennial herbaceous plant native to the southwestern United States from extreme southern Utah to Texas and northwestern Mexico.

The ferny leaves have three leaflets with three lobes and grow from the base and off the flowering stems. The flowers, which appear in May and early June, grow on a long stem above the leaves and have five pointed yellow sepals and five yellow petals with long spurs projecting backwards between the sepals. At the center of the flower are many yellow stamens.

The cultivar ‘Yellow Queen’ has gained the Royal Horticultural Society’s Award of Garden Merit.

References

External links

chrysantha